Brian Robert Parker (27 October 1944 – 27 February 2001) was an Australian rules footballer who played for the South Melbourne Football Club in the Victorian Football League (VFL).

References

External links 

1944 births
2001 deaths
Australian rules footballers from Victoria (Australia)
Sydney Swans players